Robert O'Sullivan may refer to:

Robert O'Sullivan, musician in Possum Dixon
Robert O'Sullivan (sailor), see List of World Championships medalists in sailing (centreboard classes)
Rob O'Sullivan, Western Australian Sports Star of the Year

See also
Gerald Robert O'Sullivan, Irish VC recipient
Robert Sullivan (disambiguation)